Uncial 0220 (in the Gregory-Aland numbering), also known as the Wyman fragment, is a leaf of a third-century Greek codex containing the Epistle to the Romans.

Description 
Uncial 0220 measures 12 by 15 cm. There are 14 lines to a page. The recto (4:23-5:3) is legible, but little can be made out on the verso (5:8-12). The scribe wrote in a reformed documentary hand.

The Alands describes the text-type as "strict".

Uncial 0220 is an important early witness to the Alexandrian text-type, agreeing with Vaticanus everywhere except Rom. 5:1. (See Below) It is classed as a "consistently cited witness of the first order" in the Novum Testamentum Graece. NA27 considers it even more highly than other witnesses of this type. It provides an exclamation mark (!) for "papyri and uncial manuscripts of particular significance because of their age."

Rom. 5:1:

εχομεν: א1 B2 F G P Ψ 0220vid. 104. 365. 1241. 1505. 1506. 1739c. 1881. 2464. l 846 pm vgmss

εχωμεν: א* A B* C D K L 33. 81. 630. 1175. 1739* pm lat bo; McionT

History 

Currently it is dated by the INTF to the 3rd century.

It was purchased in Cairo in 1950 by Leland C. Wyman, a professor of biology at Boston University. Later part of it was bought by Martin Schøyen and now part of it is housed in the Martin Schøyen Collection in Oslo, and part in London. In 2012 this text was purchased at a Sotheby's auction by the Green Collection. It will be on the display at the Museum of the Bible in Washington, D.C.

The text was published by William Hatch in the Harvard Theological Review in 1952.

See also 
 Other early uncials
 Uncial 0162
 Uncial 0171
 Uncial 0189
 Uncial 0301
 Sortable lists
 List of New Testament uncials
 List of New Testament papyri
 Related articles
 Textual criticism
 Biblical manuscript

References

External links 
 The Schøyen Collection
 Nikkhah, Roya.  "No sexy outfits, nuns told in 1300-year-old 'rule' book," telegraph.com, 17 June 2012, accessed 25 June 2012 - makes mention of the fragment as part of a group of manuscripts to be auctioned at Sotheby's in London in July 2012 by collector Martin Shoyen.

Further reading 
 William H. P. Hatch, A Recently Discovered Fragment of the Epistle to the Romans, HTR 45 (1952), pp. 81–85. 
 

Greek New Testament uncials
Early Greek manuscripts of the New Testament
3rd-century biblical manuscripts
4th-century biblical manuscripts